You may have been looking for arithmetic, a branch of mathematics.
ARITH-MATIC is an extension of Grace Hopper's  A-2 programming language, developed around 1955. ARITH-MATIC was originally known as A-3, but was renamed by the marketing department of Remington Rand UNIVAC.

Some ARITH-MATIC subroutines

See also
 A-0 System

References

External links
 Website at Boise via Internet Archive

Numerical programming languages